Parastenolechia suriensis is a moth of the family Gelechiidae. It is found in southern and central Korea.

The wingspan is 13–16 mm. The forewings are creamy white, densely irrorated with fuscous scales throughout and with dark brown trapezoidal patches overlaid with raised scales, as well as four to five small blackish patches beyond the last trapezoidal patch on the costa and a large blackish discal spot. The hindwings are grey.

Etymology
The species name is derived from suri, the type localion.

References

Moths described in 2006
Parastenolechia